Coquimbo Unido is a Chilean football club based in the city of Coquimbo. The club was founded August 30, 1958 and will play in the Chilean Primera División on 2022. Their home games are played at the Estadio Municipal Francisco Sánchez Rumoroso, which has a capacity of approximately 18,750 seats.

History
Seasons in Primera División: 27 (1963–65), (1978–80), (1984), (1991–2007), (2019–2020), (2022–)
Seasons in Primera B: 36 (1959–62), (1966–74), (1976–77), (1981–83), (1985–90), (2008–2018), (2021)
Copa Libertadores Appearances: 1 (1992)
Copa Sudamericana Appearances: 1 (2020)
Largest Margin of Victory: 6–0 v. Cobresal in (1999)
Largest Margin of Defeat: 1–9 v. Cobreloa in (1999)
Highest home attendance: 14,935 v. Colo-Colo, Copa Libertadores, (17 March 1992)
Most goals scored (Primera División matches): 56, Marcelo Corrales (2004-2007)
Best Finish in Primera División: Runner-up (1991 & 2005–A)
Best Finish in Copa Chile: Semifinals (2021)

Stadium

The home stadium of Coquimbo Unido its Estadio Municipal Francisco Sánchez Rumoroso, the stadium is a multi-purpose stadium in Coquimbo, Chile. It is currently used mostly for football matches. The former stadium was inaugurated on July 1, 1970 and hold 17,750 people.

In 2007 the stadium was selected as a venue for the 2008 FIFA U-20 Women's World Cup. In order to comply with FIFA standards, a completely new stadium was built. Its capacity was increased from 15,000 to 18,750. The new stadium has the shape of ship so as to homage Coquimbo's oceanic tradition. The city has been famous due to its port and pirate lore. The stadium was inaugurated on November 9, 2008.

Honours

Domestic honours
Primera División de Chile
Runner-up (2): 1991, 2005 Apertura
Segunda División de Chile/Primera B de Chile
Winners (4): 1962, 1977, 2018, 2021
Winners (no promotion to Primera División) (1): 2014 Clausura
Runner-up (2): 1966, 1990
Copa Apertura Segunda División
Runner-up (1): 1970 Copa Isidro Corbinos

South American cups history

Current squad

2023 Summer Transfers

In

Out

Notable players

 Víctor Hugo Amatti
 Matías Cano
 Jorge Cerino
 Jorge Díaz
 Alejandro Glaría
 Juan Grabowski
 Rodrigo Holgado
 Pablo Lenci
  Juan Manuel Lucero
 Norberto Ortega Sánchez
 Mario Pierani
  José Daniel Ponce
  Miguel Ángel Romero
 Rubén Tanucci
 Benê
 Carioca
 Liminha
 Ronaldo Moraes
 Torino
 Ziquita
 Antoine Helha
 Jean Denis Wanga
 Axel Ahumada
 Francisco Arrué
 Carlos Barraza
 Juan Carlos Barraza
 Jean Beausejour
 Héctor Cabello
 Carlos Carmona
 Diego Carrasco
 Juan Carreño
 Wilson Contreras
 Marcelo Corrales
 Nicolás Crovetto
  Javier di Gregorio
 Mauricio Donoso
  Óscar Fabbiani
 Ismael Fuentes
 Luis Fuentes
 Gamadiel García
 Pedro González
 Gonzalo Jara
 Eugenio Julio
 Cristian Leiva
 Daniel López
  Alí Manouchehri
 Rodrigo Millar
  Paco Molina
 Orlando Mondaca
 Leonardo Monje
 Cristián Muñoz
 Germán Navea
 Cristián Olguín
 Raúl Palacios
 Esteban Paredes
 Mauricio Pinilla
 Héctor Robles
 Juan Rodríguez Vega
 Mario Rodríguez 
 José Sulantay
 Carlos Tejas
 Patricio Toledo
 Jorge Vargas
 Richard Zambrano
 Derlis Soto
 Modou Jadama
 Leandro Reymúndez
 Manuel Abreu
 Manuel Sanhouse

Managers
Interim managers are shown in cursive.

 Santiago Salfate (1959) 
 Fidel Cuiña /  Óscar Olivares (1962) 
  "Paco" Molina (1963–64) 
 Óscar Olivares /  Raúl Pino /  Ramón Guiñazú (1965) 
 Raúl Pino (1966–68)
 Luis Santibáñez (1969)
 Óscar Olivares /  Pedro Cruces /  Enrique Hormazábal (1976) 
 Ramón Climent (1977)
 "Sacha" Mitjaew /  Luis Álamos /  José Sulantay (1978) 
 Luis Ibarra (1978–79) 
 Víctor Seura (1979) 
 Héctor Novoa /   Néstor Isella (1980) 
 José Sulantay (1980–83) 
 Antonio Vargas /  Víctor Seura /  Juan Rodríguez (1984) 
 José Sulantay (1985)
 Mario Chirino (1988)
 Víctor Zelada /  Francisco Valdés (1989)
 Ramón Climent (1990) 
 José Sulantay (1990–91)
 Jorge Luis Siviero /  Hugo Valdivia (1992) 
 Víctor Seura /  Luis Santibáñez (1993)
 "Sacha" Mitjaew /  Freddy Delgado /  Dagoberto Olivares /  José Sulantay (1994) 
 Manuel Rodríguez (1995–96)
 Víctor Comisso (1996–97)
 Miguel Hermosilla (1997–98) 
 José Sulantay (1998)
 Ángel Celoria /  Sergio Cortés /  Manuel Rodríguez (1999)
  Fernando Cavalleri (1999–00)
 José Sulantay (2001–03)
 Raúl Toro (2004–05)
 Mario Chirino (2005)
 Jorge Díaz (2006)
 Sergio Cortés+ Francisco Varela (2006–07) 
 Oscar Malbernat /  Dagoberto Olivares /  Andrija Perčić (2007)
 Nelson Cossio /  Mario Chirino (2008) 
 Víctor Comisso (2008–09)
 Gustavo Huerta (2009)
 Orlando Mondaca (2009–10)
 José Sulantay (2010)
 Diego Torrente /  Jaime Muñoz (2011) 
 Roberto Mariani (2011–12)
 Jaime Muñoz (2012) 
 Luis Musrri (2012–13)
 Dagoberto Olivares (2013) 
 Carlos Rojas (2013–14)
 Jaime Muñoz (2014)
 Víctor Hugo Castañeda (2014–15)
 Jorge Cerino+ Marcelo Corrales (2015) 
 Juan José Ribera (2015–17)
 Patricio Graff (2017–19)
 Germán Corengia /  Rafael Celedón (2020) 
  Juan José Ribera (2020–21)
  Héctor Tapia (2021–)

References

External links

  

Football clubs in Chile
Association football clubs established in 1958
Sport in Coquimbo Region
1958 establishments in Chile